3 Parachute Battalion is a Citizen Force paratroop unit of the South African Army. It was established in July 1977 within the formation of the Parachute Battalion. Later it was a battalion within 44 Parachute Brigade. As a reserve unit, it has a status roughly equivalent to that of a British Army Reserve or United States Army National Guard unit.

History
With the implementation of one year National Service in South Africa in 1968, 1 Parachute Battalion struggled to administer the Permanent Force and the Citizen Force Parabats. 
To prevent the loss of these trained national servicemen at the end of their one-year service to other units of the South African Defence Force, it was decided to form a new citizen force parachute unit to take these men. The battalion was formed at Tempe in July 1977 of five rifle companies. 

On 20 April 1978, 3 Parachute Battalion and other parachute units became part of the newly formed 44 Parachute Brigade.

Operations
3 Parachute Battalion would take part in Operation Reindeer in Angola during 1978, Elements of this battalion took part in the parachute drop over Cassinga.

Leadership

Battle Honours

References

Further reading
 

Infantry battalions of South Africa
Airborne units and formations of South Africa
Military units and formations in Bloemfontein
Military units and formations of South Africa in the Border War
Military units and formations established in 1977